Slave to the Thrill is the third studio album released by the American heavy metal band Hurricane.
The original album cover art was photographed by John Scarpati. It featured a nude female model lying on a machine. This cover was replaced shortly after the initial pressing by an alternative cover that had the female model removed from the picture so that all that was seen is the machine.

Jay Schellen and Doug Aldrich play together on this record. The twosome would later play together again in the Las Vegas production of Raiding the Rock Vault.

Track listing
All songs written by Hurricane except where noted.

 "Reign of Love" (Hurricane, Frank Simes) – 4:48 
 "Next to You" (Wendy Waldman, Brad Parker, Franne Golde) – 3:37 
 "Young Man" (Hurricane, Simes) – 3:53 
 "Dance Little Sister" – 4:52
 "Don't Wanna Dream" (Hurricane, Waldman, Parker) – 5:06 
 "Temptation" (Hurricane, Jeff Jones) – 3:13 
 "10,000 Years" (Hurricane, Adam Mitchell, Robert Sarzo) – 5:45 
 "FX" (Instrumental) – 1:06
 "In the Fire" – 3:29
 "Let It Slide" (Hurricane, Waldman, Parker) – 4:37
 "Lock Me Up" – 3:42
 "Smiles Like a Child" (Waldman, Parker, Golde) – 4:14 
Track 8 is unlisted.

Credits
Kelly Hansen – vocals
Jay Schellen – drums, percussion and vocals
Doug Aldrich – guitars and vocals
Tony Cavazo – bass guitar and vocals

Production
Engineers – Chris Minto and Brian Levi
Assistant Engineers – Mike Tacci and Jeff Frickman
Mixing – Chris Lord-Alge

References

External links
Heavy Harmonies page

Hurricane (band) albums
1990 albums
Enigma Records albums